Black River High School is a public high school located in Sullivan, Ohio.  It was consolidated in 1961 by combining the districts from Homerville, Spencer, and Sullivan.

Athletics
Black River's school colors are black and gold.  The mascot is the pirate.  The school fight song is "Across The Field".  As of 2019, the school is a member of the Lorain County League.  Black River had previously been a member of the Firelands Conference from 1964 to 1993, the Mohican Area Conference from 1993 to 2004, and the Patriot Athletic Conference (PAC-12) from 2005 to 2019.

Patriot Athletic Conference championships

Mohican Area Conference championships
 Softball - 1999
 Football -1996,
1999, 2002*

Firelands Conference championships
 Football - 1977, 1984*, 1985*, 1986, 1989, 1990*, 1992*
 Volleyball - 1978
 Boys Basketball - 1964-65*
 Softball - 1988, 1989
 Boys Track & Field - 1985
 Girls Track & Field - 1990
 Cross Country - 1987
 Baseball - 1993
Shared titles are denoted with an asterisk (*).

References

External links
 District Website

High schools in Ashland County, Ohio
Public high schools in Ohio
1961 establishments in Ohio